Shalom Avitan (born 9 January 1951) is an Israeli former professional footballer that has played in Hapoel Be'er Sheva.

Honours

Club
 Hapoel Be'er Sheva

 Premier League:
 Winners (1): 1975/1976
 Third place (1): 1982/1983
 State Cup:
 Runners-up (1): 1983/1984
 Super Cup:
 Runners-up (1): 1975/1976
 Lillian Cup:
 Runners-up (2): 1982, 1983

 Hapoel Tel Aviv

 Premier League:
 Winners (1): 1985/1986

References

1951 births
Living people
Israeli footballers
Hapoel Be'er Sheva F.C. players
Beitar Jerusalem F.C. players
Hapoel Jerusalem F.C. players
Hapoel Tel Aviv F.C. players
Hapoel Ashdod F.C. players
Israel international footballers
Liga Leumit players
Footballers from Beersheba
Association football forwards